Oxycanus kochi is a moth of the family Hepialidae. It is found in all of Australia.

References

Moths described in 1955
Hepialidae
Endemic fauna of Australia